Suthi Manyakass (born 10 August 1938) is a Thai sprinter. He competed in the 100 metres at the 1960 Summer Olympics and the 1964 Summer Olympics.

References

External links
 

1938 births
Living people
Athletes (track and field) at the 1960 Summer Olympics
Athletes (track and field) at the 1964 Summer Olympics
Suthi Manyakass
Suthi Manyakass
Place of birth missing (living people)
Southeast Asian Games medalists in athletics
Suthi Manyakass